FC Puuma Tallinn is a defunct Estonian football club based in Tallinn and was founded in 1981.

Reserves

History
Football Club Puuma was founded in October 1981 in Tallinn.

References

External links
 Official website
 Team at Estonian Football Association

Puuma Tallinn
Association football clubs established in 1981
Puuma
1981 establishments in Estonia